Lethrinus erythracanthus, common names the orange-spotted emperor, orangefin emperor, and yellow-spotted emperor, is a species of emperor fish.

Description
Lethrinus erythracanthus is the largest of the 27 species in the genus Lethrinus. The body is dark brown-grey in colour with scatterd golden-orange spots. It has a short snout. Present on the body are small, light and dark stripes that appear indistinct. These are occasionally present on the lower sides. The head of this species is a brown or grey colour with large eyes that help it feed in the dark. Smaller adults commonly have small, yellow-orange spots on each cheek.

Fins
This species has a distinctive bright orange caudal fin. Younger species have a slightly forked caudal fin that is often bright orange. This fin becomes rounded when the fish matures. 
In adults, the dorsal and anal fins are rounded and usually bluish and orange mottling or blue spots. The pelvic and pectoral fins are orangish to white in colour. In specimens from the Indian Ocean, the fins are a straw yellow colour instead of orange. The fins have strong spines.

Distribution
This species is found in the waters of East Africa, east to the Tuamotus archipeligo and the Society Islands. It is recorded from the Ryukyu Islands in the north, down to the northeastern waters of Australia as well as New Caledonia.

Habitat
Lethrinus erythracanthus is found at depths of between 15 and 120 metres. It is a reef-associated fish and is non-migratory. It lives in channels, the slopes of outer reefs and the soft bottoms that are adjacent. It is also found in deep lagoons. In the day, it may be solitary in or around caves or by ledges.

Diet
This fish is carnivorous and is a bottom-feeder. It is known to eat such animals as starfishes, mollusks, crinoids, echinoids, echinoderms, and crustaceans.

Human uses
This fish is considered to be high-value as food and is caught by sport fishers. When caught in some locations, it may be ciguatoxic and should not be consumed.

References

External links
 

Lethrinidae
Fish described in 1830